Helene Stanley (born Dolores Diane Freymouth; July 17, 1929 – December 27, 1990) was an American actress. She is best known for being the live model for Cinderella, Aurora, and Anita Radcliffe.

Early life
Stanley was born in Gary, Indiana. Her parents were Michael Freymouth, who was an acrobat who worked in Europe, and Gerty Freymouth (née Seigert).

Career
Stanely used the stage name "Dolores Diane." In 1946, she started to work with MGM and began to use the stage name "Helene Stanley," with one of her most notable appearances being a brief, but memorable role in John Huston's The Asphalt Jungle (1950).

Her collaboration with Disney started around 1948. She became the live-action model for the main character in Cinderella, Aurora in Sleeping Beauty, and Anita Radcliffe in One Hundred and One Dalmatians.

Personal life
Helene Stanley was married to Johnny Stompanato on January 17, 1953, with their divorce dated February 10, 1955.

After Stompanato, Stanley married a physician from Beverly Hills, David Niemetz. They had a son, David Niemetz Jr., in 1961. After they were married, Stanley formally retired from show business. Her last role in her career was in One Hundred and One Dalmatians.

Death
Stanley died on December 27, 1990, in Los Angeles. The cause of her death was not reported.

Filmography

1940:  Fantasia
1942: Girls' Town - Sally
1943: Hi, Buddy - Specialty 
1943: Moonlight in Vermont - A Jivin' Jill
1945: Patrick the Great - Member, Jivin' Jills (uncredited)
1945: Thrill of a Romance - Susan
1946: Holiday in Mexico - Yvette Baranga
1947: Brick Bradford - Carol Preston
1948: My Dear Secretary - Miss 'Clay' Pidgeon (uncredited)
1949: Mr. Soft Touch - Donna (uncredited)
1949: Bandit King of Texas - Cynthia Turner
1949: All the King's Men - Helene Hale (uncredited)
1950: Cinderella (As live-action model for Disney animators to use as a guide) (Cinderella)
1950: A Woman of Distinction - Minor Role (uncredited)
1950: The Asphalt Jungle - Jeannie - Girl in Diner (uncredited)
1952: Diplomatic Courier - Airline Stewardess
1952: Wait till the Sun Shines, Nellie - Eadie Jordan
1952: We're Not Married! - Mary (uncredited)
1952: Dreamboat - Mimi
1952: The Snows of Kilimanjaro - Connie
1953: Roar of the Crowd - Marcy Parker
1953: Once I Will Return - Gloria
1954: Carnival Story - Peggy
1954: Circus of Love - Lore
1955: Davy Crockett, King of the Wild Frontier - Polly Crockett (archive footage)
1955: Dial Red O - Connie Wyatt
1959: Sleeping Beauty (As live-action model for Disney animators to use as a guide) - Princess Aurora
1959: "Perry Mason The Case of the Foot-Loose Doll" (Fran Driscoll)
1961: One Hundred and One Dalmatians (As live-action model for Disney animators to use as a guide) - Anita

References

External links 
 

1929 births
1990 deaths
American film actresses
American television actresses
20th-century American actresses
Actresses from Gary, Indiana